Aldersund Church is a parish church of the Church of Norway in Lurøy Municipality in Nordland county, Norway. It is located in the village of Haugland. It is the church for the Aldersund parish which is part of the Nord-Helgeland prosti (deanery) in the Diocese of Sør-Hålogaland. The white, wooden church was built in a long church style in 1971 using plans drawn up by the architect John Egil Tverdahl. The church seats about 230 people.

See also
List of churches in Sør-Hålogaland

References

Lurøy
Churches in Nordland
Wooden churches in Norway
20th-century Church of Norway church buildings
Churches completed in 1971
1971 establishments in Norway
Long churches in Norway